Dasol, officially the Municipality of Dasol, is a 3rd class municipality in the province of Pangasinan, Philippines. According to the 2020 census, it has a population of 31,355 people.

Dasol is a popular town for the production of commercial salts. Seawater is fed into large ponds and water is drawn out through natural evaporation which allows the salt to be harvested. Dasol Bay occupies the whole coastline of Dasol and it is where the town gets its saltwater.

History

The town got its name from the medicinal herb "dosol" which abound in the locality during the Spanish period. The leaves of this herbal plant are greenish and oval in shape. It is a tuber relatively very low in height. It was commonly used to cure infected wounds, but was found to have the unusual characteristic of miraculously disappearing (abandoning its post) for unknown reason never to be located again. Its name was frequently mispronounced as Dasol by the Spaniards, so that when the place was established as municipality in the 19th Century, Dasol became its official name.

Secession from Zambales and other towns
On November 7, 1903, the northern part of Zambales was annexed to the Province of Pangasinan. The municipalities ceded were Alaminos, Bolinao, Anda, San Isidro de Putot, Bani, Agno, and Infanta. Townsfolk cited alleged lack of concern for the towns' interest and welfare by the Zambales provincial government and was encouraged to join Pangasinan province. However, for allegedly the same reason, there was a movement to rejoin Zambales, which clamor was aroused by the incumbency of then President Ramon Magasaysay, a Zambales-born president in the middle of the 1950s. This proposal was wiped out completely when Governor Aguedo Agbayani of Pangasinan became the governor.

As early as 1878, Dasol was not as a municipality as it is now, but was part of San Isidro de Putot municipality which also include the present municipalities of Mabini (at that time was named as Barrio Balincaguin), and Burgos. At that time, there were few people lived in Dasol. Balincaguin was the most thickly populated barrio and later became an independent municipality. The people, in their desire for better living conditions, moved to the south-west. They found good fishing grounds and they decided to stay along the coast in the barrio of Uli, Dasol. In 1911, by virtue of Executive Order No. 25, signed by Governor General William Cameron Forbes, Dasol seceded from San Isidro de Putot, San Isidro de Putot was renamed as Burgos (in honor of José Apolonio Burgos) and Balincaguin was renamed as Mabini (in honor of Apolinario Mabini).

Boundary issues
Ever since its creation, the boundaries of Dasol with the municipalities of Burgos, Mabini and Infanta remain vague, for what the leaders of Dasol had claimed to be the boundaries then agreed upon and as allegedly borne out by records, are no longer respected by the respective officials of said adjoining municipalities. Instead, they have encroached into Dasol's domain. During the incumbency of Mayor Liceralde, he made an attempt to settle Dasol's boundary with Mabini, but even after two separate conferences between the officials of the two towns were already had, each group was adamant in its own version. Considering that there was no visible sign of a probability for an amicable settlement of the dispute, the idea was abandoned so as to give way to court battle. He allegedly said that it was time-consuming to gather relevant documentary evidence (parol evidence no longer available due to the death of reliable witnesses) that would clinch the case for Dasol. The same appears to be true with respect to the other boundary conflicts.

Dasol War History

Philippine Revolution
A revolutionary group was organized in the Central Luzon on January 14, 1898, under General Francisco Macabulos. The Pangasinan sub-group was headed by Vicente del Prado, who together with Daniel Maramba reached an understanding to launch an attack on Spanish situations. On March 7, 1898, a simultaneous attack was suddenly made upon convents in number of towns of western Pangasinan (then as northern Zambales). Areas of San Isidro de Putot, Dasol (proper), and Eguia were among attacked. The Spanish detachments in these towns and around fifty Spanish friars were defeated.

World War II
Dasol Bay has been witness to several naval battles in World War II.  On August 23, 1944, while searching for new targets, the American submarines USS Harder and USS Hake were attacked by Kaibokan CD-22 and PB-102 (ex-USS Stewart (DD-224)). Thinking that it was just a Japanese minesweeper and a three-stack Siamese destroyer Phra Ruang, the Japanese vessel operated in consort with the anti-submarine vessel attacked and sank USS Harder through a technique known as a depth charge  attack. USS Hake was also attacked but escaped and arrived at Fremantle Harbor, Australia on September 24, 1944.

On November 6, 1944, while guarding convoy Ma-Ta 31, Japanese cruiser Kumano was attacked by a US submarine wolf-pack consisting of the Batfish, Guitarro, Bream, Raton and the Ray. In all, the American submarines launched 23 torpedoes towards the convoy, two of which struck the Kumano. The first hit destroyed the ship's recently replaced bow, and the second damaged its starboard engine room. Kumano escaped and was towed to Dasol Bay by the cargo ship Doryo Maru, and from there the ship was moved to the beach and underwent repairs. On November 25, 1944, Kumano came under aerial attack by aircraft launched by the USS Ticonderoga. Five torpedoes and four 500 pound bombs struck the ship, and rolled over and sank in about 31 m (100 ft) of water.

Political History

No record has been found regarding the reign of a governardorcillo in this municipality but records show that there was already an organized government, with Santos Jimenez, Vicente Liceralde, Gaspar Estrada and Pedro Estrada as early capitan municipáles.

Cornelio Estrada was the capitan municipál from 1898 until 1900. At the height of the Katipunan resistance against the Americans, Francisco Bernal was the capitan municipál.

During the time San Isidro Putot was established, the town had been under three rulers, who ruled in different terms, namely:  Lucas Bonilla (1899–1901), Nazario Nacar (1901–1903), and Paulino Mendoza (1904–1908).

When Dasol municipality was created, Apolonio Casipit was its first president. He was succeeded by Leandro Cristobal from 1912 to 1916.  Calixto Tobias was the municipal president from 1916. In 1918, Tobias was assassinated by an unknown assailant. His unexpired term was served by his vice mayor, Severino delos Reyes. In the following election,  Apolonio Casipit won and served his second term from 1918 to 1920. Succeeding him was Pedro dela Rosa from 1921 to 1925.

In the years 1925 to 1932,  Marcelo Jimenez was elected and served for two consecutive terms. In the following election, Flaviano Cristobal served as the last Municipal President from 1932 to 1935. He was elevated as Dasol's first Municipal Mayor, when the Commonwealth Government was established. He was followed by Juan Castro (1937–1939). Mayor Castro failed to serve the entire period of his term due to health conditions making his vice mayor, Emiliana R. Jimenez as Acting Municipal Mayor for the unexpired term (1940). In the next election, Flaviano Cristobal ran again and won, making him as the Municipal Mayor of Dasol at the outbreak of the second world war. He was forced to vacate the office in 1944 when he joined guerilla movement intervention. His vice mayor, Teodoro Milgar served as acting mayor for the unexpired term. When Philippine Independence came in 1946,  Marcelo A. Jimenez was appointed by President Roxas as Acting Municipal Mayor. Like Mayor Castro, Mayor Jimenez failed to serve the entire period of his term in the same year.

Isidro Bustria served the unexpired term of Marcelo A. Jimenez from 1946 until 1948. In the 1948 election, Damaso E. Rivera won and served as municipal mayor. In 1950, Rivera failed to finish his term and his vice mayor, Segundo Basuel, served his unexpired term. In 1952, Cristino R. Jimenez won and served for four consecutive terms (1952–1967), winning three re-elections. In 1968, Ramon G. Liceralde won as mayor. 1976 local elections was suspended due to the existence of martial law. Liceralde, was so far the only lawyer-mayor of Dasol. In 1978, Benjamin Ochotorena was appointed Municipal Mayor until 1980. Ludovico R. Espinosa was elected and served as mayor from July 1980 until the government reorganization on June 10, 1986, by President Corazon Aquino. Manuel Bunao was appointed OIC Mayor from June 16, 1986, to November 17, 1986. Espinosa appealed and he was reinstalled on November 18, 1986. In June 1988, he was elected and served a new mandate. In the May 11, 1992 elections, Espinosa was defeated by Sergio N. Jimenez. Jimenez also defeated Espinosa in two successive elections (1995,1998). Due to term limits set by the Philippine Local Government Code of 1991, Sergio Jimenez gave way to his wife, Angelita Ocampo-Jimenez to run for the 2001 elections. Mrs. Jimenez won beating Vice Mayor Moises Alejos. In the 2004 elections, Mrs. Jimenez won her second term unchallenged. In the 2007 elections, Councilor Noel Nacar challenged Jimenez and won as new mayor of Dasol. He then served for three consecutive terms. In the 2016 elections, Nacar had his daughter run for mayor as his successor but was defeated by Eric Verzosa, son of former PNP Director General Jesus Verzosa.

Peace and order

The town, however, suffered a black eye in the matter of peace and order. In the 1950s, insurgency surfaced, the first of its kind. The HUKBALAHAP made a surprise when it raided the municipal hall on August 25, 1950, and burned it into ashes. At the same the mayor's residence was raided causing him to leave the remainder of his term to his vice mayor. The so-called revolutionary taxes were being exacted and secretly collected from residents that the collectors presumed to be well-to-do. Rallies and meetings of activists waving red flaglets were held time and again in the public plazas castigating the municipal and provincial officials and its established government. Paved roads, plaza concrete fences, even school fences were painted in red thee emblem of communism and painted in black the human skull just below the word "DEMOCRACY".

Certain residents including some public officials were actively involved. At long last, the military came to encamp so that the rallies were quelled and vandalism stopped. But secret activities of the insurgent civilians perpetrated anywhere in populated places or inside private dwellings. It would seem that insurgency was not all to blame. Common criminality and vindictiveness could have motivated some or many of the killings. No less than twenty fresh human lives (civilians, police and military) perished with their assailants unknown one of it was the killing of a retired US major bonus whose attackers are unknown. Ambuscades were staged along highways and other roadways one of the most famous was the ambush of seven people and keep it alongside of a paved road. Even private residences were invaded fearlessly to insure the killing of the intended victim. Even Mayor Espinosa at that time was not spared when about ten of his cows inside their "koral" one evening were gunned simultaneously.

Geography
Dasol is a small town in western Pangasinan, situated in a plateau. It is bounded on the north by the municipalities of Burgos and Mabini, the mineral-rich Zambales mountains in the east, the municipality of Infanta on the south, and the vast South China Sea on the west. It has an area of about 230 square kilometers.

Barangays

Dasol is politically subdivided into 18 barangays. These barangays are headed by elected officials: Barangay Captain, Barangay Council, whose members are called Barangay Councilors. All are elected every three years.

Dasol had seven barrios (now called barangay) when it was created. These were Tambobong, Tanobong, Uli, Malacapas, Bongalon, Alilao and Poblacion. Eguia was then part of Infanta and was annexed to Dasol in 1925. As years went by and due to its increasing population, two more barrios were created. Eguia was divided to form other three barangays namely Macalang, Viga and Tambac. Then came the time when Tambobong was to create Magsaysay and Tanobong (Malimpin) was divided to create San Vicente. Later, Bongalon (Hermosa) was divided to create Petal out of its two sitios Penec and Espital and from Alilao, two more barangays were formed now known as Amalbalan and Gais-Guipe. The sitios of Macalang, Pantol, Tapac and Pagdagaan were constituted into a barrio of Macalang by virtue of Republic Act 1707.

Climate

Demographics

Religions
 Jehovah's Witnesses
 Roman Catholic Church
 Philippine Independent Church
 Iglesia ni Cristo
 United Methodist Church
 Assembly of God
 Pentecostal
 Seventh Day Adventist
 Iglesia Mistica De Dios
 Jesus is Lord
 Lord of the Harvests

Economy 

The basic livelihood of the town includes salt making, small scale fishing, bagoong making, charcoal making, fruitwine making, and farming (mostly rice crops).

An average family raises only PhP 5,561.67 and spends PhP 4,506.58 mostly for basic needs.

Majority of Dasol's income came from commercial salt making, with 14 major salt producers in the municipality.

Dasol is rich in non-metallic resources. It has 360,230,000 m³ of limestone and 5,245 metric tons of guano.

About 0.5 km2 of Dasol is used for commercial crops mostly for rice and vegetable production. The municipality have several coconut and mango plantations. Since it lie on the Zambales Mountain Range, the municipality have 6,513 mango fruit bearing trees.  One of the plantations is the Carolina Farm and Mango Orchard owned by Menardo Jimenez, former GMA Network president.

Most of Dasol's livestock includes poultry, swine, cattle, goats, and carabaos with 6,370 livestock raisers all across the municipality.

Mining Areas
 Barangay Tambac
 Barangay Viga

Registered Mining Operators:
 A & P Mineral Trading

Government
Dasol, belonging to the first congressional district of the province of Pangasinan, is governed by a mayor designated as its local chief executive and by a municipal council as its legislative body in accordance with the Local Government Code. The mayor, vice mayor, and the councilors are elected directly by the people through an election which is being held every three years.

Elected officials

Festivals

Dasol celebrates the annual feast of its Catholic patron Saint Vincent Ferrer every first Friday of Lent (after Ash Wednesday). Dasol follows the tradition of every Filipino fiesta. At sunrise, a thanksgiving mass is rendered simultaneously in all Roman Catholic Church and Philippine Independent Church locations in Dasol. at 9:00 AM, a parade of all public officials and government employees are held at Barangay Poblacion public roads. In the afternoon, an open sports tournament sponsored by the Youth Council are held in the municipal hall compound. By the evening, senior citizen organizations and Filipino-American organizations celebrate a cocktail party at the municipal auditorium. Most of the attendants do ballroom dancing.

During the months of April and May barangay-based feasts were celebrated.

Gallery

See also 
 Salt evaporation pond
 USS Harder (SS-257), a US submarine submerged in the Battle of Dasol Bay, World War II
 USS Ticonderoga (CV-14), US aircraft carrier
 Japanese cruiser Kumano, a Japanese cruiser

References 

 Dasol Fiesta Souvenir – Published by the Municipal Government of Dasol (no ISBN Code)
 Island, beach, bridge, and sunset photos taken by Bill Lovelock, La Hermosa Beach Resort

External links 

 Dasol Profile at PhilAtlas.com
 Municipal Profile at the National Competitiveness Council of the Philippines 
 Official website
 Dasol at the Pangasinan Government Website 
 Local Governance Performance Management System
 [ Philippine Standard Geographic Code]
 Philippine Census Information

Municipalities of Pangasinan